Panaeolus fimicola is a widespread but seldom identified "little brown mushroom" which sometimes contains small amounts of the hallucinogen psilocybin. Panaeolis ater is a synonym. The species is also referred to as the "turf mottlegill".

Description 
Cap: (1)1.5— 3.5(4) cm, Campanulate then convex to plane, obtuse, dingy gray to blackish, often with reddish or hazel tones, hygrophanous, pallid grey to yellowish when dry, smooth, with a narrow brown marginal band, slightly striate at the margin when moist. Flesh thin and grayish.
Gills: Adnate, close to crowded, at first gray-olivacous, becoming mottled and darkening to black with age, edges remaining whitish.
Spores: Blackish gray.
Stipe: (4)6 — 8(10) cm x 1 — 2(3) mm, equal, slender, slightly enlarging at the base, hollow, fragile, dingy white to clay, becoming brownish towards the base in age, smooth, white-pruinose at the apex, obsoletely slightly silky-striate, ring absent. Flesh is dirty ochraceous-buff; fragile.
Taste: Not distinctive.
Odor: Not distinctive.
Microscopic features: Spores 10.8 — 14.2 X 6.9—9.5, ellipsoid or lemon shaped, basidia 4 spored. Gill edge cystidia fusiform, typically with long necks, gill face cystidia absent.

Habitat and formation
Panaeolus fimicola can be found growing solitary to scattered in soil or dung, fertilized lawns and other grassy places, late spring to mid-fall. It is widespread and common across the Americas, as well as Europe and Africa. It has also been found in Turkey. Panaeolus Fimicola will often appear during or after a cold rain.

See also

List of Panaeolus species

References

External links
 Panaeolus fimicola photo
 Panaeolus fimicola cheilocystidia
 Panaeolus fimicola spores

fimicola
Psychoactive fungi
Psychedelic tryptamine carriers
Fungi of Europe
Fungi of North America
Fungi of Africa
Fungi described in 1821
Taxa named by Elias Magnus Fries